Sugar Daddy is a 2020 Canadian drama film, directed by Wendy Morgan. The film stars Kelly McCormack as Darren, a talented but struggling young singer-songwriter who decides to sign up for a paid dating service to make extra money.

The film has its world premiere at the 2020 Whistler Film Festival, and was nominated for three Canadian Screen Awards, winning two.

Plot
The film follows Darren, a 20-something fledgling musician who signs up for a paid dating service to fund her creative projects.

Cast

Release and awards
The film premiered at the 2020 Whistler Film Festival, where McCormack received an honorable mention for the Borsos Competition award for best performance in a Canadian film, and won the One to Watch award.

The film received three Canadian Screen Award nominations at the 9th Canadian Screen Awards in 2021, for Best Supporting Actor (Feore), Best Editing (Christine Armstrong), and Best Original Song (Marie-Hélène L. Delorme for "Timid Joyous Atrocious").

Morgan won the DGC Award for Best Direction in a Feature Film from the Directors Guild of Canada in October 2021.

Reception
On review aggregator Rotten Tomatoes the film has a score of  based on reviews from  critics, with an average  rating. Based of 5 critics on Metacritic, the film have a score of 78 out of a 100, indicating "generally favorable reviews".

Amil Niazi of The Globe and Mail wrote "Sugar Daddy will be gripping viewing for anyone who wonders what it takes to make it - and whether it's all worth it in the end".

Bobby LePire of Film Threat praised the film's "outstanding writing, stylish, dazzling direction, and a breathtaking, radiant performance from Kelly McCormack", adding that "the drama never lets the audience go and proves to be a searing examination of its young protagonist and the society she lives in".

References

External links

Sugar Daddy at Library and Archives Canada

2020 drama films
Canadian drama films
English-language Canadian films
2020s English-language films
2020s Canadian films